"Invaders Must Die" is the eighteenth single released by the British electronic band the Prodigy. It was released from the band's website as a free digital download on 26 November 2008. It was the first single from the album Invaders Must Die. The download was announced on 24 November, in a newsletter sent to fans, and first aired on Zane Lowe's Radio 1 show as his 'Hottest Record in the World' on 26 November. The song was co-produced by Does It Offend You, Yeah?'s James Rushent. Liam Howlett described this to the Dubai edition of Time Out as: "a very abrasive-sounding electronic track, kind of different to anything we've done before." Although not being a commercial single the track charted at 49 in the UK Singles Chart on 1 March 2009, whilst the Chase & Status remix reached 53 in the Australian Aria Singles Chart and 7 in the Aria Dance Chart. On 30 November 2009 the re-amped version by Liam was released as an EP with the B-side Mescaline, and Thunder remixes.

James Rushent co-produced parts of the song on a laptop while on tour with his band, same with Omen. He said he would work on the song early in the morning and e-mail it to Liam Howlett.

Music video
The music video features Noel Clarke walking around the British countryside and encountering or creating the Prodigy's "ant" logo. Among other places, he walks past the acoustic mirrors at Denge and at the end he is standing on one of the Maunsell Forts in the Thames Estuary. For a few seconds, the band can be seen in the video.

Invaders EP

On 30 November 2009, "Invaders" was released as an EP on CD and limited edition green transparent 7" vinyl record. The EP is classed as a single to the Invaders Must Die special edition which was the original album released in February 2009 with 3 bonus tracks and a remix CD, a DVD of the music videos to Invaders Must Die and a 48-page booklet. The Invaders Must Die special edition was released 3 November 2009.

Track listing
CD single
 "Invaders Must Die" (Liam H Re-amped Version) – 2:56
 "Mescaline" – 4:58
 "Thunder" (Arveene & Misk's Storm-Warning Remix) – 5:27
 "Invaders Must Die" (Proxy remix) – 4:03

Limited edition green transparent 7" vinyl
 "Invaders Must Die" (Liam H Re-amped Version) – 2:56
 "Thunder" (Doorly Remix) – 4:21

Personnel

The Prodigy
Liam Howlett – keyboards, producer, programming

Additional musicians
James Rushent – co-producer

Charts

References

Songs about death
The Prodigy songs
2008 singles
Songs written by Liam Howlett
2008 songs
Songs written by Nick Halkes